Belle Creek Airport  is a county-owned, public-use airport in Powder River County, Montana, United States. It is located one nautical mile (2 km) northeast of Belle Creek.

As of August 15, 2014, the 3V7 FAA code is unknown in the FAA NASR system.

In the List of airports in Montana, it is listed as a notable former airport which closed circa 2009.

Facilities and aircraft 
Belle Creek Airport covers an area of 30 acres (12 ha) at an elevation of 3,678 feet (1,121 m) above mean sea level. It has one asphalt paved runway designated 8/26 which measures 3,770 by 50 feet (1,149 x 15 m).

For the 12-month period ending July 12, 2006, the airport had 550 general aviation aircraft operations, an average of 45 per month. At that time there were four aircraft based at this airport: three single-engine and one ultralight.

See also 
 List of airports in Montana

References

External links 
 Aerial image as of August 1996 from USGS The National Map
 Airport information for 3V7 at AirNav
 Aeronautical chart at SkyVector

Defunct airports in the United States
Airports in Montana
Transportation in Powder River County, Montana
Buildings and structures in Powder River County, Montana